Shipley is a civil parish in the Amber Valley district of Derbyshire, England.  The parish contains twelve listed buildings that are recorded in the National Heritage List for England.  Of these, one is listed at Grade II*, the middle of the three grades, and the others are at Grade II, the lowest grade.  The parish contains the village of Shipley and the surrounding area.  The most important building in the parish was Shipley Hall, but this was demolished in 1948.  A number of buildings in its grounds are listed, including a model farm, a former water tower, a house, and two lodges with their associated gateways.  The Erewash Canal passes through the parish and the listed buildings associated with it are a bridge, a lock and a cottage.  The other listed buildings are two road bridges to the south of Shipley Lake.


Key

Buildings

References

Citations

Sources

 

Lists of listed buildings in Derbyshire